Ralph Ouseley (7 May 1739–1803) was an Irish antiquarian and major in the British Army.  (The family name is variously spelled Ouseley or Ousley.)

Family 
His brother was John, who was father to Gideon Ouseley and grandfather to major-general Ralph Ouseley.

Ralph himself had several children by two wives.
By his first wife Elizabeth Holland of Limerick (whom he married on 1 April 1763) he had three daughters and two sons, William who became an orientalist and Gore who became a Baronet.
Elizabeth died on 28 November 1782, and he took a second wife, Mary Collins, with whom he only had 1 surviving child, Joseph Walker Jasper Ouseley who also became an orientalist.

He lived in Limerick and in Dunmore, County Galway.

Antiquarianism 
Ralph was a member of the Royal Irish Academy and was a collector and an antiquarian.

He was published several times in the Transactions of the Academy, including for example  which recounted his discovery of three Later Bronze Age horns in Carrigogunnell, County Limerick.

Works

References

Reference bibliography

Further reading 
  
 
 

18th-century antiquarians
Irish antiquarians
1739 births
1803 deaths
Members of the Royal Irish Academy